Archana Joglekar is an Indian actress and classical dancer. She has acted in Marathi, Odia and Hindi films and television serials. Some of her noted films are Sansaar (Hindi), Eka Peksha Ek (Marathi) and Anapekshit (Marathi). She is a Kathak dancer and choreographer. She was trained in Kathak by her mother, Asha Joglekar, a Kathak danseuse and instructor. In 1963, her mother founded a dance school in Mumbai called Archana Nrityalaya. In 1999, Joglekar opened a branch of this dance school in New Jersey, US.

Filmography
 Suna Chadhei (1987) (Odia)
 Rangat Sangat (1988)
 Mardangi  (1988)
  Bhrahmmarshi Vishvamitra
 Sansar (1987) as Rajni
 Billoo Badshah (1989) as Nisha
 Eka Peksha Ek (1990) (Marathi) as Sona
 Baat Hai Pyaar Ki  (1991) as Anjali
 Mogamul  (1994) (Tamil)
 Aatank Hi Aatank (1995) as Razia
 Aag Se Khelenge (1998)
 Stree  (1998) (Odia)
 Married 2 America (2012) as Anjali Malhotra
 Nivdung (Marathi Film with Ravindra Mankani)
 Anpekshit (With Nitish Bharadwaj, and Ashok Saraf)

Television
 Chunauti (1987)
 Karmabhoomi
 Phoolwanti (1992) as Phoolwanti
 Kissa Shanti Ka
 Chahat Aur Nafrat (1999) as Pooja

References

External links

 Archana Joglekar, website
 
 
 Archana Joglekar Pan Pasand Ad

Indian film actresses
Marathi people
Living people
Indian television actresses
Actresses in Hindi cinema
Actresses in Odia cinema
Actresses in Marathi cinema
Kathak exponents
1965 births